is a weekly shōnen manga magazine published in Japan by Shogakukan since March 1959. Contrary to its title, Weekly Shōnen Sunday issues are released on Wednesdays. Weekly Shōnen Sunday has sold over 1.8billion copies since 1986, making it the fourth best selling manga magazine, only behind Weekly Shōnen Jump, Weekly Shōnen Magazine and Weekly Young Jump.

History
Weekly Shōnen Sunday was first published on March 17, 1959, as a response to its rival Weekly Shōnen Magazine. The debut issue featured Shigeo Nagashima, the star player of the Yomiuri Giants on the cover, and a congratulatory article by Isoko Hatano, a noted child psychologist.

Despite its name, Weekly Shōnen Sunday was originally published on Tuesdays of each week, switching to Wednesdays in 2011. The "Sunday" in the name was the creation of its first editor, Kiichi Toyoda, who wanted the title to be evocative of a relaxing weekend.

 Weekly Shōnen Sunday's distinctive "pointing finger" that appears in the lower corner of every page on the left side of the magazine made its subtle debut in the 4/5 issue from 1969. This understated feature, ever present but easily overlooked, was referenced as a plot element in 20th Century Boys. Sunday'''s more noticeable mascot, a helmeted fish debuted in the 1980s.

Prior to the 1990s and 2000s no serial in Weekly Shōnen Sunday had run over 40 volumes, but that began to change with series such as Detective Conan, Major, Inuyasha, Karakuri Circus, Shijō Saikyō no Deshi Kenichi, Hayate the Combat Butler, Zettai Karen Children and Be Blues!, which maintained a high level of popularity.

In a rare event due to the closeness of the two magazine's founding dates, Weekly Shōnen Sunday and Weekly Shōnen Magazine released a special combined issue on March 19, 2008. In addition, other commemorative events, merchandise, and manga crossovers were planned for the following year as part of the celebrations. The book Shonen Sunday 1983 was published on July 15, 2009 to celebrate the anniversary and the magazines heyday. It reprints manga from 1983, such as Urusei Yatsura and Touch, and has interviews with their creators as well as artists who were inspired by the series from that period, such as Gosho Aoyama.

To celebrate Weekly Shōnen Sunday's 55th anniversary, 55 new manga series were launched in the print and online magazines Weekly Shonen Sunday, Shōnen Sunday S, Ura Sunday, and Club Sunday throughout the year beginning in March 2014.

Features
Series

There are currently 29 manga titles being serialized in Weekly Shōnen Sunday. Out of them, Frieren: Beyond Journey's End is on hiatus; Magic Kaito is infrequently published; Case Closed is serialized on an irregular basis; and Ad Astra per Aspera and Detective Conan: Zero's Tea Times continuations are yet to be announced.

Circulation

Editors-in-chief
 Kiichi Toyoda (1959–1960)
 Yoshio Kinoshita (1960–1963)
 Michio Tamio (1963–1965)
 Yunosuke Konishi (1965–1967)
 Yoshiya Takayanagi (1967–1969)
 Yoshio Kinoshita (1969–1970)
 Shizuo Watanabe (1970–1972)
 Keizo Inoue (1972–1977)
 Kazuki Tanaka (1977–1984)
 Koichiro Inomata (1984–1987)
 Harunori Kumagai (1987–1991)
 Takashi Hirayama (1991–1994)
 Harunori Kumagai (1994–1996)
 Toyohiko Okuyama (1996–2000)
 Shinichiro Tsuzuki (2000–2001)
 Shinichi Mikami (2001–2004)
 Masato Hayashi (2004–2009)
 Masaki Nawata (2009–2012)
 Yu Torimitsu (2012–2015)
 Takenori Ichihara (2015–2021)
 Kazunori Oshima (2021–present)

 International versions 
Elex Media Komputindo published an Indonesian version of Weekly Shōnen Sunday titled Shōnen Star from 2005 to 2013.

Viz Media began a Shonen Sunday imprint for titles in North America; starting with Rumiko Takahashi's Rin-ne, which was released on October 20, 2009.

See alsoShōnen Sunday SMonthly Shōnen Sunday''

References

Further reading

External links
 
Viz Media's Shonen Sunday page

1959 establishments in Japan
Weekly manga magazines published in Japan
Magazines established in 1959
Shogakukan magazines
Shōnen manga magazines